The 1954–1955 St. Francis Terriers men's basketball team represented St. Francis College during the 1954–55 NCAA Division I men's basketball season. The team was coached by Daniel Lynch, who was in his seventh year at the helm of the St. Francis Terriers. The team was a member of the Metropolitan New York Conference and played their home games at the Bulter Street Gymnasium in their Cobble Hill, Brooklyn campus and at the II Corps Artillery Armory in Park Slope, Brooklyn.

The team was a member of the Metropolitan New York Conference continuously since 1945, although the team first joined the conference in its inaugural year, 1933.

Roster

Schedule

|-
!colspan=12 style="background:#0038A8; border: 2px solid #CE1126;;color:#FFFFFF;"| Exhibition 

|-
!colspan=12 style="background:#0038A8; border: 2px solid #CE1126;;color:#FFFFFF;"| Regular Season  

   
  

  
|-
!colspan=12 style="background:#0038A8; border: 2px solid #CE1126;;color:#FFFFFF;"|NAIA Tournament

References

External links
 St. Francis Terriers men's basketball official website

St. Francis Brooklyn Terriers men's basketball seasons
St. Francis
Saint Francis
Saint Francis